The Nitra Synagogue (Slovak: Synagoga v Nitre) is a historical building in Nitra, Slovakia.

The synagogue was built in 1908–11 for the Neolog Jewish community. It was designed by Lipót Baumhorn (1860–1932), the prolific Budapest-based synagogue architect. Situated in a narrow lane, the building is a characteristic example of Baumhorn's style. A melange of Moorish, Byzantine and Art Nouveau elements, it faces the street with a twin-tower façade.

The sanctuary is a domed hall supported by four pillars that also support the women's gallery. After more than a decade of painstaking restoration by the municipality of Nitra, the building is now used as a center for cultural activities.

The women's gallery houses "The Fate of Slovak Jews" – Slovakia's national Holocaust memorial exhibition. The synagogue serves as a permanent exhibition space for graphic works by the Nitra-born Israeli artist Shraga Weil.

See also
 History of the Jews in Slovakia

References

External links

Synagogues in Slovakia
Synagogues preserved as museums
Jewish Slovak history
Synagogues completed in 1911
20th-century architecture in Slovakia
1911 establishments in Slovakia
Neolog Judaism synagogues
Buildings and structures in Nitra